The Mexican–American War was highly controversial in American history. It saw both strong advocates on behalf of and against the war.

Propaganda in many of these instances takes on the broader implication of the definition. In the sense that propaganda is an overtly political technique that seeks to persuade others to a certain point of view is the direction this page takes. While some of the references made may have multiple angles to them, this page focuses on a single part of the intent behind them, showing the propaganda messages employed in the Mexican–American War by Americans who either supported or opposed the war.

Background 

The problem of slavery would eventually be a major factor in the American Civil War, but in the immediate aftermath of the War of 1812 it became a controversial but manageable topic with important agreements such as the Compromise of 1820. However, as the territorial boundary of the United States continued to push westward and restless settlers fanned across the land this issue began to heat up.

The rebellion of Texas and its corresponding entrance into the United States set off a clash with Mexico. The problem with Texas joining the United States from the U.S. point of view was adding yet another slave territory, but for Mexico it was the contention over Texas' independence from Mexico in the first place. President Polk, an avid expansionist, moved troops in the disputed border regions and as Mexico did as well, border clashes resulted in a war which would see propaganda from pro-war advocates and anti-war advocates and show the cracks in the union which would result in Civil war in another 15 years from the start of the Mexican–American War.

Pro-War Advocates 

Pro-war propaganda came from many people in the war. There were those of pro-slavery expansion and those of the Manifest Destiny tendency. Such pro-war propaganda came from various citizens ranging from common citizens to President Polk.

President Polk is of note for his first inaugural address. While a full year before the outbreak of war, the tone sets the stage for the eventual conflict. Polk says:

I regard the question of annexation as belonging exclusively to the United States and Texas. They are independent powers competent to contract, and foreign nations have no right to interfere with them or to take exceptions to their reunion ... Our Union is a confederation of independent States, whose policy is peace with each other and all the world. To enlarge its limits is to extend the dominions of peace over additional territories and increasing millions. The world has nothing to fear from military ambition in our Government ... Foreign powers should therefore look on the annexation of Texas to the United States not as the conquest of a nation seeking to extend her dominions by arms and violence, but as the peaceful acquisition of a territory once her own, but adding another member to our confederation, with the consent of that member, thereby diminishing the chances of war and opening to them new and ever-increasing markets for their products.

To Texas the reunion is important, because the strong protecting arm of our Government would be extended over her ... while the safety of New Orleans and of or whole southwestern frontier against hostile aggression, as well as the interests of the whole Union, would be promoted by it . . .

As our boundaries have been enlarged and our agricultural population has been spread over a large surface, our federative system has acquired additional strength and security."

Polk makes numerous appeals in his speech. Among them include an argument that Texas was at one point a part of the United States. He further adds that the U.S. means no aggression by the seizure and therefore foreign governments, namely Europe and Mexico, should not take it as a dangerous move. Finally he appeals to American based on two fronts, one based on the argument of self-defense and another on strengthening the federalist system of a large republic as made in Federalist 10.

Anti-War Advocates 

The anti-war movement was almost entirely  made up  of anti-slavery advocates. Among these were Henry David Thoreau and Abraham Lincoln.

Thoreau's Civil Disobedience is a prominent example of anti-Mexican War propaganda. Thoreau refused to pay a poll tax to vote because he opposed the Mexican–American War, and so spend time in jail. During his time there he wrote "Civil Disobedience" to, among many points, bring attention to the unjust nature of the war and call for opposition to it.  In it, he wrote:

Among many of the other war critics/people were numerous newspapers around the country, many of which were abolitionist based. Some, such as the Anti-Slavery Bugle, claimed that the Mexican War was one of conquest,  others, like the Vermont Watchman and State Journal that the American people were  being duped into the war through false pretenses,

Lincoln, as a Representative in the U.S. House, claimed on the House floor that President Polk had lied about the conflict as he drew conclusions regarding initial skirmishes that were on disputed territory rather than on land that was  part of the sovereign United States. Lincoln stated:

Lincoln's argument was supported by a majority of the U.S. House who voted to censure President Polk for starting what they claimed was an illegal and unconstitutional war. This represented a further propaganda tool in the arsenal of the Whigs and anti-war advocates.

References 

Mexican–American War
Mexican-American War
Mexican-American War